Artsyom Zakharaw (born 12 July 2002) is a Belarusian professional footballer.

References

External links 
 
 

2002 births
Living people
Belarusian footballers
Association football goalkeepers
FC Gorodeya players
Sportspeople from Minsk Region